The British Automatic Fire Sprinkler Association (BAFSA) is the trade body for the fire sprinkler industry in the United Kingdom.

Members of BAFSA install over 85% of the sprinkler installations in the United Kingdom. Its objectives include providing information on the advantages of sprinkler systems and how they can save life and property in the event of a fire.

Selected publications
Frequently Asked Sprinkler Questions (2013)
Retrofitting Sprinkler Systems (2013)
Sprinklers: A Guide for Owners and Occupiers (2015)

References

External links 
http://www.bafsa.org.uk/
BAFSA Publications.

Trade associations based in the United Kingdom
Fire protection organizations
Organisations based in Cambridgeshire
Ely, Cambridgeshire